Dual specificity phosphatase 27, atypical is a protein that in humans is encoded by the DUSP27 gene.

References

Further reading